The Caniçada Dam is a concrete arch dam on the Cávado River, the civil parish of Parada do Bouro, in the municipality of Vieira do Minho, in the Portuguese Norte (district of Braga). It is owned by Companhia Portuguesa de Produção de Electricidade (CPPE).

History

The dam was completed and began functioning in 1955.

In 196, approval was obtained to begin a program of observation of the dam, as proposed by the Laboratório Nacional de Engenharia Civil (Civil Engineering National Laboratory).

Architecture

Reservoir
With the 144,4 mio. m³ water 32 GWh can be produced.

Power plant
The hydroelectric power plant went operational in 1954. It is operated by EDP. The plant has a nameplate capacity of 62 (60
or 100) MW. Its average annual generation is 337.4 (283, 345 or 346) GWh. The power station contains 2 Francis turbine-generators with 31 MW (34 MVA) each in an underground powerhouse 134 m below the surface. The turbine rotation is 300 rpm. The minimum hydraulic head is 77 m, the maximum 121 m. Maximum flow per turbine is 34 m³/s. The turbines and generators were provided by Voith.

See also

 List of power stations in Portugal
 List of dams and reservoirs in Portugal

References

Notes

Sources
 
 

Dams in Portugal
Hydroelectric power stations in Portugal
Arch dams
Dams completed in 1955
Energy infrastructure completed in 1955
1955 establishments in Portugal
Buildings and structures in Braga District
Underground power stations
Vieira do Minho
Cávado River